Deuterocopus planeta is a moth of the family Pterophoridae. It is found from India, through south-east Asia and the Indonesian Archipelago.

The wingspan is 10–11 mm.

The larvae have been recorded feeding on the flowers of Leea sambucina.

References

External links
Papua Insects

Deuterocopinae
Moths of Asia